Calvary Baptist Church (also known as Second Street Baptist Church; Saint Paul Baptist Church) is a historic Baptist church at 2nd and Walnut Streets in Oklahoma City, Oklahoma.

It was built in 1921 and added to the National Register in 1978. Martin Luther King Junior spoke in this church during the Civil rights movement. In 2012, Dan Davis Law purchased the building for office use and brought it back to its former life with more than $2,000,000 in renovations.

References

External links
Civil Right information
Calvary Baptist information
Ownership & History - The Oklahoman
https://www.oklahoman.com/story/business/columns/steve-lackmeyer/2013/02/15/calvary-baptist-church-being-brought-back-to-life-as-law-firm/61005993007/
https://dandavislaw.com/about/

African-American history in Oklahoma City
Baptist churches in Oklahoma
Churches on the National Register of Historic Places in Oklahoma
Churches completed in 1958
Churches in Oklahoma City
National Register of Historic Places in Oklahoma City